Zalesie  is a village in the administrative district of Gmina Drużbice, within Bełchatów County, Łódź Voivodeship, in central Poland.

The village has a population of 30.

See also
There are a number of villages by the same name in the Łódź Voivodeship area. For their locations see the gminas of Kodrąb, Wartkowice, Wielgomłyny, Zadzim, Zelów, as well as the powiats of Brzeziny, Kutno, Łask, Łowicz, Skierniewice, and Tomaszów.

References

Villages in Bełchatów County